Diversinitidae are an extinct family of Chalcid wasps. Three genera are known, all from the early Cenomanian aged Burmese amber. They are distinguished by the presence of multiporous plate sensilla on the first flagellomere in both sexes. They are among the most basal and earliest known members of Chalcidoidea.

References 

Chalcidoidea
Burmese amber
Prehistoric insect families